The Lords River, officially Lords River / , is a river of Stewart Island, New Zealand. It is called  (sometimes ) in Māori. Named Port South East by Owen Smith when he first charted the island in 1804, John Grono later renamed it Lords River in 1809.

See also
List of rivers of New Zealand

References

Rivers of Stewart Island